"This Means War" is a song recorded by Canadian pop rock group Marianas Trench for their fourth studio album, Astoria (2015). It was serviced to Canadian radio on February 16, 2016 as the album's second official single. The song was written and produced by the band's lead singer, Josh Ramsay.

"This Means War" was the first single of the group's career to not enter the Billboard Canadian Hot 100.

Content
"This Means War" is about the absence of emotion that follows a break up, and how sometimes people would rather fight than feeling nothing; as Ramsay sings in the chorus, "I'd rather be a riot than indifferent." The song explores the thin line between love and hate with respect to passion. Musically, the song has been compared to Bananarama's "Cruel Summer", particularly in its use of the xylophone. The song's melody also shares similarities with Tom Cochrane's 1991 hit, "Life is a Highway".

Promotion
The band released a lyric video for the song through their Vevo account on March 10, 2016. "This Means War" was included in the setlist for their Hey! You Guys and Never Say Die tours in support of Astoria.

Music video
An accompanying music video was filmed in Los Angeles, California in the spring of 2016 and was directed by Anthony Chirco. It premiered May 20, 2016. Inspired by the musical West Side Story, the video depicts the band competing in a territorial "dance battle" with a rival gang. Ramsay explained the video's premise in the following statement: "Put on your leather, stretch your hamstrings and grab your can of paint! We're invading each other's turf but there can be only one. This means war!"

Charts

References

2015 songs
2016 singles
604 Records singles
Songs written by Josh Ramsay
Marianas Trench (band) songs